Student Sport Ireland (SSI), formerly the Colleges and Universities Sports Association of Ireland (CUSAI), is the governing body for sport in third-level education in Ireland. CUSAI was originally formed in November 2005 when the Irish universities and the institutes of technology decided to come together and form one organisation to oversee Irish third level student sport. It was renamed in 2013.

With financial support from Sport Ireland, the organisation has two full-time employees who are based in Sport HQ at the National Sports Campus.

The organisation coordinates participation in international programmes, including the multi sport World University Games (or Universiade) and championship events in which Irish students compete across the globe. The organisation also assists the national and student governing bodies of each sport to develop competition and recreation programs, with the goal to "enhance student health and well-being through increasing participation in sport and physical activity".

References

External links

Sports organizations established in 2005
University Sports
University Sports
2005 establishments in Ireland
 
Ireland